Smith Inlet is an ice-filled inlet receding  in a westerly direction between Cape Boggs and Cape Collier, along the east coast of Palmer Land. The inlet was discovered and charted in 1940 by the U.S. Antarctic Service, but it was later erroneously shown on charts as Stefansson Inlet. During 1947 the inlet was photographed from the air by the Ronne Antarctic Research Expedition under Finn Ronne, who in conjunction with the Falkland Islands Dependencies Survey charted it from the ground. It was named by Ronne for Rear Admiral Edward H. Smith, USCG, noted Arctic oceanographer and explorer, leader of and later Director of the Woods Hole Oceanographic Institute.

The Benson Hills are located near the head of Smith Inlet.

See also
Elder Bluff

References

 

Inlets of Palmer Land